Trypt0fanatic is the third album from the Kidneythieves, released on July 20, 2010. The physical CD is only being distributed independently through the band's official website. There have been 5 bonus tracks digitally released only during 2010-2011. These include "Light Deceiver" (originally a free pre-order), "Tears On A Page [Live Acoustic]", Jude (Be Somebody) [Acoustic], and 2 remixes of "Lick U Clean", one by Beat Ventriloquists (included when you purchase a selected Tee or Tank from the KT Store), and the other by KMFDM.

Track listing
Jude (Be Somebody) - 3:17
Beg - 3:38
Freeky People - 3:42
Velveteen - 4:05
Dead Girl Walking - 4:04
Size of Always - 3:41
Comets + Violins - 3:34
Lick U Clean - 3:43
Dark Horse - 3:31
Tears on a Page - 4:18

Bonus tracks
Light Deceiver - 4:39 Download Only
Tears on a Page (Live Acoustic) - 5:35 Download Only

References
Trypt0fanatic page on the official website

2010 albums
Kidneythieves albums